Alex Fees (born July 11, 1964) is an American television anchor and news correspondent.

Life
Fees was born on July 11, 1964, and studied at East Central College, where he gained an Associate of Arts degree in journalism, and Southeast Missouri State University, where he gained a Bachelor of Arts in communications, graduating in 1987. While at Southeast he worked on the university newspaper, the Capaha Arrow, and following an internship with KTVO decided to go into television work.

From 1998 to 2013, Fees had worked as a correspondent at KSDK. He has also done five reports for other NBC affiliates and individual reports with CNBC, MSNBC, CNN and ABC. He has won awards from the Nebraska Broadcasting Association and Nebraska A.P. Broadcasters.

References

1964 births
Living people
American television news anchors